Bobbie Gentry's The Delta Sweete Revisited is an album by American rock band Mercury Rev. The album, which is a re-imagining of Bobbie Gentry's 1968 album The Delta Sweete, was released on February 8, 2019 through Partisan Records. Song-by-song cover version of the album with "Louisiana Man" replaced by "Ode to Billie Joe".

Track listing

Personnel
Mercury Rev
Grasshopper
Jesse Chandler
Jonathan Donahue

Charts

References

2019 albums
Gothic country albums
Mercury Rev albums
Tribute albums